Francisco Antonio Laureana (1954 – February 27, 1975) was a young Argentine killed by the Buenos Aires police, who believed him to be a rapist and serial killer called The Satyr of San Isidro, who for a period of six months - from 1974 and 1975 - raped women, of whom he murdered 13. He killed most of his victims on Wednesdays and Thursdays near 6:00 P.M.

Crimes 
The police reconstructed the events based on what they believed to be a series of murders and the psychological profile of the murderer. Francisco Laureana, 22, had been an intern in a Catholic school in the city of Corrientes in northern Argentina.
The police claimed that Laureana had fled Corrientes because he had raped and hanged a nun from the stairs of the school. In July 1974, he moved to the city of San Isidro (in the north of the Greater Buenos Aires), where he worked as an artisan selling hoops, bracelets and necklaces. He married a woman who had three children.

Before going to work, he would say to his wife: "Do not let the kids outside because there are many degenerates."

Almost every Wednesday and Thursday, about 6 o'clock in the evening, a woman or girl disappeared in the city. Their bodies were found shortly afterward in vacant lots, with signs of having been raped and killed savagely. Some victims were strangled and others shot with a .32 caliber revolver.
The victims were mainly women who sunbathed in nearby villas or who waited at bus stops. The "satyr" always stole something from his victims, such as rings, bracelets, chains, etc., which he kept as trophies in a boot at home. Sometimes he would return to the crime scene weeks later to relive the experience.

Due to the repeated modus operandi, police and forensics expert Osvaldo Raffo believed that the deaths could be the work of a single individual.

After committing one of his homicides, a witness saw the perpetrator fleeing on the roof of a house, but he was shot at with a gun. Said witness was unharmed and was key to making an identikit of the suspect that began to circulate around the city.

Death 
On Thursday, February 27, 1975, an eight-year-old girl saw Francisco Laureana and thought he looked like the serial killer. After telling her mother, the woman pretended to call her husband but notified the authorities. Laureana passed by, smiled, and continued on.

The police found him a few blocks away and because his characteristics were similar to the identikit's, they approached the suspect, asking him to accompany them for an interrogation. According to the police report, Laureana then took a gun from his shoulder bag and started firing at the officers, initiating a shootout in which he was shot in the shoulder. The badly injured Laureana escaped, hiding from the police in a chicken coop near a mansion. However, a dog "marked" Laureana's hiding place to its owner, prompting the police to approach the coop and pepper Laureana with bullets.

The authorities regretted killing him, as they wanted to interrogate him about his motives for committing murders. Two hens were found dead in the coop (it is unknown if the police or Laureana with his violent urges killed them). When his wife was informed, she said that "There must have been a mistake. My husband could not have done all that. He was a good father, a good husband, and a craftsman who loved what he did."

As the killer was a fetishist, many of his crimes were solved when the police found the boot in which the victims' items were stashed, along with firearms.

The case of Francisco Antonio Laureana, one of the most prolific murderers in Argentine history, went relatively unnoticed due to the complex political climate during the government of Isabel Perón.

See also 
 List of serial killers by country
 List of serial killers by number of victims

References

External links 

1952 births
1975 deaths
Argentine rapists
Argentine serial killers
Male serial killers
People shot dead by law enforcement officers